The St. Thomas More Church is part of a Roman Catholic church complex located on East 89th Street, off Madison Avenue on the Upper East Side in Manhattan, New York City. The parish is under the authority of the Archdiocese of New York. Attached to the complex is the church (1870), a single-cell chapel (1879), a rectory (1880), and a parish house (1893). The church was built for the Protestant Episcopal Church as the Chapel of the Beloved Disciple in the Gothic Revival architectural style. Under various names, the church building has been used by three Christian denominations, including Episcopalians, Dutch Reformed, and Catholics. It is the second-oldest church on the Upper East Side.

History and design
The church was built from sandstone from Nova Scotia in 1870 to a design by the architectural firm of Hubert & Pirsson. Architectural historian and New York Times journalist Christopher Gray wrote that "The Gothic-style building has the air of a picturesque English country church, with a plot of green in front and a square tower rising in front of the sanctuary. According to Andrew S. Dolkart, an architectural historian specializing in church design, the building is closely modeled after Edward Buckton Lamb's Church of St. Martin's, Gospel Oak, London (see Gospel Oak), built in 1865. 'It has almost every little quirky detail of the London church,' says Mr. Dolkart. 'The chamfered corners, the varying planes of the façade, the asymmetrical pinnacle at the top of the tower. It really captures your attention.'"

Attached to the complex are a single-cell chapel (1879), and a rectory and a parish house (1880 and 1893). The larger Episcopal Church of the Heavenly Rest, on Fifth Avenue and 45th Street, relocated to 2 East 90th Street, forcing Beloved Disciple to merge with it (its name retained in a chapel). The old church was sold in 1929 to wealthy Dutch Reformed congregants from Harlem who formed the Second Collegiate Church of Harlem. In 1950 they sold the church to the Roman Catholic Church, who rededicated it to St. Thomas More.

The church was renovated in the later half of the 20th century by architect Paul C. Reilly.

Notable parishioners
Jacqueline Kennedy Onassis was a parishioner there until her death, and she had a Mass offered for John F. Kennedy every November 22 on the anniversary of his death, a tradition later maintained by her daughter Caroline. Her 1994 funeral was held at the nearby St. Ignatius of Loyola because of the number of attendees. On July 23, 1999, after the death and cremation of John F. Kennedy, Jr., the Kennedy family held a private memorial service for him at St. Thomas More, at which Senator Ted Kennedy gave the eulogy and President Bill Clinton attended. Peggy Noonan is also a parishioner. Fashion and street photographer Bill Cunningham was also a regular parishioner and a private Requiem Mass was celebrated for the repose of his soul by Fr Kevin Madigan on June 30, 2016. The private funeral for Lee Bouvier Radziwill was held at the church on 25 February 2019.

References

Roman Catholic churches completed in 1870
19th-century Episcopal church buildings
19th-century Roman Catholic church buildings in the United States
Gothic Revival church buildings in New York City
Victorian architecture in New York City
Buildings converted to Catholic church buildings
Roman Catholic churches in Manhattan
Former Episcopal church buildings in New York City
Former Dutch Reformed churches in New York (state)
Upper East Side